Frank Wall is a former Irish politician. He briefly served as a Fianna Fáil member of the 16th Seanad. He was nominated by the Taoiseach Charles Haughey, on 13 December 1982, to fill a vacancy after the November 1982 general election. He did not contest the 1983 Seanad election.

He was the General Secretary of the Fianna Fáil party from 1981 to 1991.

References

Year of birth missing (living people)
Living people
Fianna Fáil senators
Members of the 16th Seanad
Nominated members of Seanad Éireann